Toxins